The Wheeling Ironmen were a professional American football team based in Wheeling, West Virginia, and played their home games at Wheeling Island Stadium. The team began play in 1962 as a member of the United Football League, where they played for three seasons until that league dissolved. The Ironmen won the UFL championship during their first two seasons in the league.

Wheeling became a charter member of the new Continental Football League in 1965, along with four other former UFL teams. Financial difficulties prompted the team to file for bankruptcy in April 1968, and also vote to give up their COFL franchise. Later that month the team announced they would in fact stay in the league, and hold a fundraising drive. Prior to the start of the 1968 COFL season the team changed their name to the Ohio Valley Ironmen.

On December 15, 1969 the COFL revoked the Ironmen's franchise for failure to meet the league's financial obligations; the league itself collapsed a few months later.

External links
 1962-1969 Wheeling Ironmen / Ohio Valley Ironmen

References

American football teams in West Virginia
Continental Football League teams
Sports in Wheeling, West Virginia
United Football League (1961–1964) teams
American football teams established in 1962
American football teams disestablished in 1969
1962 establishments in West Virginia
1969 disestablishments in West Virginia